Servair is a subsidiary of Air France (50,01%) and Swiss catering company Gategroup (49,99%), specialised in airline catering. Servair has its head office in the Continental Square complex in Roissypôle, Paris-Charles de Gaulle Airport and in Tremblay-en-France.

Servair is a French company with around 10,000 employees, providing restaurant services, equipping and cleaning. It has 130 customer companies. servair and its subsidiaries had a turnover of more than 761.5 million euros in 2010–2011.

The Servair network, composed of Servair, its partners (Alpha, Flying Food Group, Servair Air Chef and Eurest Servair) and its technical support, has more than 100 units throughout the world.

Airline service trades

Servair has four main activities:
 Catering, i.e. in-flight food services.
 Handling, i.e. equipping and logistics, which is the loading/unloading of aircraft (pillows, blankets, trolleys, etc.) and the management and storage of hotel products (e.g. preparation of drinks, food, tax free products).
 Ramp, i.e. airport assistance, going from runway assistance to terminal assistance.
 Cleaning, i.e. cabin service, to prepare a clean and comfortable aircraft.
 9,150 employees
 755 million euros in turnover
 7.8 million euros of net consolidated result
 More than 100 units around the world, with its partners

Catering

 45 million meal trays prepared per year
 200 000 trays per day
 16,300 tonnes of food products delivered every year
 More than 100 cooks
 1,000 menus and 5,300 different recipes

Cleaning and logistics
 365,000 aircraft handled every year
 39,000,000 seats cleaned per year
  of carpet cleaned per year
 217 vehicles including 41 heavy duty vehicles
 365,000 interventions with reduced mobility passengers
 40.5 million newspapers and 11 million magazines supplied per year

Quality
 40 hygiene, microbiology and quality experts
 17 units certified ISO 9001 v2000
 50,000 analyses per year realised by the Servair laboratory, COFRAC accreditation award
 7 international experts monitoring the scientific committee

History 
 1971: Creation of Servair
 1974: Servair has 520 employees
 1975: Creation of Servair Lyon
 1986: Servair provides restaurant services for presidential journeys
 1990: Creation of Armement Cabine et Nettoyage Avion, a company specialising in cleaning and equipping aircraft
 1990: 20 million trays served per year
 1990: Servair continues its establishment in Africa with the creation of DAKAR Catering
 1991: Opening of Jet Chef at Le Bourget
 1992: Opening of the units Servair 2, Orly Air Traiteur (OAT) and CPA at Roissy
 1995: Servair is present in 14 countries
 1999: Creation of Culin’Air Paris with Star Airlines and Bruneau Pégorier Catering
 2000: Servair serves 40 million meals per year
 2001: Opening of Special Meals Catering, a kosher production unit in Paris
 2002: Opening of Mali Catering in Bamako Airport
 2003: Opening of the new Servair laboratory
 2004: Inauguration of a new kitchen in Mauritania
 2005: CPA has transformed itself into a catering centre specialized in long-haul activity

See also

References

External links 
 

Airline catering
Foodservice companies
Air France–KLM
Aircraft ground handling companies
Food and drink companies of France
Business services companies established in 1971
French companies established in 1971